Rubén Dario Rodríguez Martinez (born August 4, 1964 in Cabrera, María Trinidad Sánchez, Dominican Republic) is a former Major League Baseball catcher.

External links

1964 births
Living people
Dominican Republic expatriate baseball players in the United States

Major League Baseball catchers
Major League Baseball players from the Dominican Republic
Pittsburgh Pirates players
Acereros de Monclova players
Alexandria Dukes players
Buffalo Bisons (minor league) players
Denver Zephyrs players
Dominican Republic expatriate baseball players in Mexico
Greenwood Pirates players
Harrisburg Senators players
Hawaii Islanders players
London Tigers players
Nashua Pirates players
New Britain Red Sox players
Pawtucket Red Sox players
Dominican Republic expatriate baseball players in Canada
Vancouver Canadians players